Elenia is a Finnish distributor of electrical energy with 430,000 customers. It covers more than 100 municipalities in Tavastia, Pirkanmaa, Keski-Suomi, Southern Ostrobothnia and Central Ostrobothnia.

References

Electric power distribution network operators in Finland
Companies based in Tampere